Andrzej Wiszowaty Sr. (Latin Andreas Wissowatius) (Filipów 1608 - Amsterdam, 1678) was a Socinian theologian who worked with Joachim Stegmann (1595–1633) on the Racovian Catechism of 1605, and taught at the Racovian Academy of the Polish Brethren.

After the expulsion and exile from Rakow in 1639 Andrzej Wiszowaty Sr. is notable as the main mover in the printing of the Bibliotheca fratrum Polonorum which was to influence Voltaire and John Locke. He supervised the printing in Amsterdam by Frans Kuyper, first of the works of Johann Crell (1665) and then, backnumbered as "Volume 1" the works of his grandfather Fausto Sozzini 1668. He was working on a revised edition of the Racovian Catechism when he died in 1678, this was published in Amsterdam in 1680 and became the basis for Thomas Rees' English translation of 1818. His own major work Religio rationalis "Rational religion" was published by his son Benedykt Wiszowaty.

Family

Polish nobleman. Coat-of-arms: Pierzchała/Roch
great-grandfather Krzysztof Morsztyn Sr. (1522-1600) founder of Filipow.
grandparents Fausto Sozzini and Elisabeth Morsztyn (sister of Krzysztof Morsztyn Jr. c.1580-d.1642)
parents - Stanisław Wiszowaty and Agnieszka Sozzini.
married - Aleksandra z Rupniowskich
son - Benedykt Wiszowaty (c.1650-c.1704)
grandson - Andrzej Wiszowaty Jr., born in exile in Prussia, from 1724 teacher at the Unitarian Academy in Cluj-Napoca, Transylvania.

Works
62 works including:
 A dissertation against the Trinity, De sancta trinitate objectiones quaedam (1665), that was refuted by Leibniz in his Defensio Trinitatis contra Wissowatium (1669).
 Narratio compendiosa quomodo in Polonia a Trinitariis Reformatis separati sint Christiani Unitarii (1678).
 Religio rationalis, seu de Rationis judicio in controversiis, etiam theologicis ac religiosis (posthumously 1685).

Publisher in Amsterdam with Kuyper of the Bibliotheca Fratrum Polonorum quos Unitarios vocant, instructua operibus omnibus Fausti Socini (1665, 1668).

 Hymns and Psalms in Polish

References

External links
 Works by Andrzej Wiszowaty in digital library Polona

1608 births
1678 deaths
Polish Unitarians
People from Suwałki County
17th-century Polish philosophers